George Gordon (20 September 1846 – 18 May 1923) was an Australian cricketer. He played two first-class matches for New South Wales between 1866/67 and 1867/68.

See also
 List of New South Wales representative cricketers

References

External links
 

1846 births
1923 deaths
Australian cricketers
New South Wales cricketers